The vampire ground finch (Geospiza septentrionalis) is a small bird native to the Galápagos Islands. It was considered a very distinct subspecies of the sharp-beaked ground finch (Geospiza difficilis) endemic to Wolf and Darwin Islands. The International Ornithologists' Union has split the species supported by strong genetic evidence that they are not closely related, and divergences in morphology and song.  Other taxonomic authorities still consider it conspecific.

Description
The vampire finch is sexually dimorphic as typical for its genus, with the males being primarily black and the females grey with brown streaks. It has a lilting song on Wolf, a buzzing song on Darwin, and whistling calls on both islands; only on Wolf, a drawn-out, buzzing call is also uttered.

Ecology
This bird is most famous for its unusual diet. When alternative sources are scarce the vampire finch occasionally feeds
by drinking the blood of other birds, chiefly the Nazca and blue-footed boobies, pecking at their skin with their sharp beaks until blood is drawn. Curiously, the boobies do not offer much resistance against this. It has been theorized that this behavior evolved from the pecking behavior that the finch used to clean parasites from the plumage of the booby. The finches also feed on eggs, stealing them just after they are laid and rolling them (by pushing with their legs and using their beak as a pivot) into rocks until they break. Finally guano and leftover fish from other predators additionally serve as diet options. 

Vampire ground finches drinking more blood from season to season, preying on blood during dry seasons when seeds and other prey are scarce, and resuming omnivorous predation when the rainy season begins. There were also significant variations in the intestinal microbial community structure. There was a clear and separation between vampire ground finches and other finches. Vampire ground finch birds have peptostreptococcacea and rich in intestinal microbial communities. Similarly, vampire bats are also creatures with peptostreptococcacea.

More conventionally for birds, but still unusual among Geospiza, they also take nectar from Galápagos prickly pear (Opuntia echios var. gigantea) flowers at least on Wolf Island. The reason for these peculiar feeding habits is the lack of fresh water on these birds' home islands. Nonetheless, the mainstay of their diet is made up from seeds and invertebrates as in their congeners.

Conservation
The vampire finch is classified as vulnerable by the IUCN based on its very restricted distribution and the impact of invasive species in its habitat.

References

External links
 

Geospiza
Endemic birds of the Galápagos Islands
Hematophages
Parasitic vertebrates
Birds described in 1899
Taxa named by Walter Rothschild
Taxa named by Ernst Hartert